{{Taxobox
| domain = Bacteria
| phylum = Pseudomonadota
| classis = Alphaproteobacteria
| ordo = Rhodospirillales
| familia =  Rhodovibrionaceae
| genus = Pelagibius 
| genus_authority = Choi et al. 2009
| type_species = Pelagibius litoralis
| subdivision_ranks = Species
| subdivision = P. litoralis| synonyms = 
}}Pelagibius is a Gram-negative and strictly aerobic genus of bacteria from the family Rhodovibrionaceae with one known species (Pelagibius litoralis).Pelagibius litoralis'' has been isolated from coastal seawater from Korea.

References

Rhodospirillales
Bacteria genera
Monotypic bacteria genera
Taxa described in 2009